Dimitrios "Takis" Taliadoros (1925 – 25 May 2011) was a Greek basketball player. He competed in the men's tournament at the 1952 Summer Olympics.

References

1925 births
2011 deaths
Greek men's basketball players
Olympic basketball players of Greece
Basketball players at the 1952 Summer Olympics
Basketball players from Thessaloniki